Visions is an album by the American soul group Gladys Knight & the Pips, released in 1983.

The album peaked at No. 34 on the Billboard Top LPs & Tape chart. "Save the Overtime (For Me)" reached No. 1 on the Hot Black Singles chart.

Production
Half of the album's songs, including "Save the Overtime (For Me)", were produced by the group.

Critical reception

Robert Christgau wrote: "Accurately acclaimed as her finest work in a decade, this is amazingly uniform for an album featuring eight different bassists and eight different drummers recorded in eight different studios in L.A., Nashville, and Vegas." The Philadelphia Inquirer deemed the album "an uneven but nonetheless bold mixture of styles—sultry ballads, squeaky-clean pop and pumping funk tunes." 

The Washington Informer thought that "'Oh La De Da'—a brassy, fun-filled, funky celebration of the boogie—is a refreshing departure from the ups and downs of luv." Stereo Review opined that Knight "is buried in a mire of unimaginative and downright boring arrangements."

AllMusic called "Save the Overtime (For Me)" "the kind of jubilant, celebratory, rousing performance that had marked their best Motown singles, and it put some fresh life into what had become a stagnant group."

Track listing

References

Gladys Knight & the Pips albums
1983 albums
Columbia Records albums